Deyse Jurdelina de Castro (born 18 September 1933) is a Brazilian sprinter. She competed in the women's 200 metres at the 1952 Summer Olympics.

References

1933 births
Living people
Athletes (track and field) at the 1952 Summer Olympics
Brazilian female sprinters
Brazilian female high jumpers
Olympic athletes of Brazil
Place of birth missing (living people)
Pan American Games medalists in athletics (track and field)
Pan American Games silver medalists for Brazil
Athletes (track and field) at the 1951 Pan American Games
Athletes (track and field) at the 1955 Pan American Games
Medalists at the 1955 Pan American Games
21st-century Brazilian women
20th-century Brazilian women